Martina Del Trecco (born 28 October 2001) is an Argentine footballer who plays as a forward for River Plate and the Argentina women's national team.

Club career
Del Trecco has played for River Plate in Argentina.

International career
Del Trecco made her senior debut for Argentina on 8 April 2021 as a 78th-minute substitution in a 0–0 friendly draw against Venezuela.

References

External links

2001 births
Living people
People from Villa Mercedes, San Luis
Argentine women's footballers
Women's association football forwards
Club Atlético River Plate (women) players
Argentina women's international footballers